Villarreal Club de Fútbol "B" is a Spanish football team based in Villarreal, in the autonomous community of Valencia. Founded in 1999, it is the reserve team of Villarreal CF and plays in Segunda División, holding home games at Ciudad Deportiva Villarreal CF, with a 5,000-seat capacity.

Background
Unlike in other nations such as England, reserve teams in Spain play in the same football pyramid as their senior team rather than a separate league. However, reserve teams cannot play in the same division as their senior team. Therefore, the team is ineligible for promotion to the division in which the main side plays. Also, if the main team is relegated to the division in which its reserve side played in the prior season (which happened in 2011–12), the reserve team is automatically relegated to the division below the main team. Reserve teams are also no longer permitted to enter the Copa del Rey.

Premier League International Cup
Villarreal successfully applied to compete in the 2014–15, 2015–16 and 2016–17 versions of the England-based Premier League International Cup. They won the tournament in 2016, beating PSV in the final. Most of Villarreal's players in this Under-23 tournament have been drawn from the B side with some additions from C Team and the Juvenil group.

Season to season

4 seasons in Segunda División
1 season in Primera División RFEF
11 seasons in Segunda División B
4 seasons in Tercera División
4 seasons in Categorías Regionales

Players

Current squad
.

Reserve team

Out on loan

Coaching staff

   David Pérez

   Ferran Romero   Diego Manero

See also
Villarreal CF – First team
Villarreal CF C – Third team

References

External links
Official website 
Futbolme team profile 

Football clubs in the Valencian Community
Association football clubs established in 1999
Spanish reserve football teams
Villarreal CF
1999 establishments in Spain
Premier League International Cup
Segunda División clubs
Primera Federación clubs